MillionPlus, formerly known as million+, the Campaign for Mainstream Universities, and the Coalition of Modern Universities (CMU), is a membership organisation, which aims to promote the role of "modern universities" in the UK higher education system; it describes itself  as "The Association for Modern Universities in the UK". MillionPlus is not for profit and funded by subscriptions from its members, currently 23 UK universities. While all of the member institutions are "new" universities, many have long histories as colleges and polytechnics.

Overview
Formed in 1997 as the Coalition of Modern Universities, the name was changed in 2004 to the Campaign for Mainstream Universities. In November 2007, the organisation was rebranded to million+. This name was chosen to reflect the fact that the member institutions educate over a million students. In April 2016, the organisation rebranded again to MillionPlus.

MillionPlus is involved in the political debate about the role and contribution of universities to the economy and society, where it is seen as representing the post-1992 universities, known as 'new' or 'modern'. As such, it is frequently quoted in the media on higher education topics, such as the Government's green paper on higher education reform, reform of the external examination system, and the economic diversity of the student population.

The group is chaired by Professor Rama Thirunamachandran, Vice-Chancellor of Canterbury Christ Church University.
The Chief Executive is Rachel Hewitt.

Member institutions

 Abertay University
 Anglia Ruskin University
 Bath Spa University
 University of Bedfordshire
 University of Bolton
 University of Central Lancashire
 Canterbury Christ Church University
 University of Cumbria
 University of East London
 Edinburgh Napier University
 Glasgow Caledonian University
 University of the Highlands and Islands
 Leeds Trinity University
 London Metropolitan University
 London South Bank University
 Middlesex University
 Queen Margaret University
 Solent University
 Staffordshire University
 University of Sunderland
 University of West London
 University of the West of Scotland
The University of Wolverhampton

See also
 1994 Group
 GuildHE
 Russell Group
 University Alliance
 Universities UK
 Armorial of UK universities

References

External links
 

1997 establishments in the United Kingdom
Organizations established in 1997
College and university associations and consortia in the United Kingdom